Kassandra (minor planet designation: 114 Kassandra) is a large and dark main-belt asteroid. It belongs to the rare class T. It was discovered by C. H. F. Peters on July 23, 1871, and is named after Cassandra, the prophetess in the tales of the Trojan War. The asteroid is featured in the 2009 film Meteor, in which it is split in two by a comet, and set on a collision course with Earth.

This object is classified as a rare T-type asteroid, with parts of the spectrum displaying properties similar to the mineral troilite and to carbonaceous chondrite. The shape of the spectrum also appears similar to fine grain from the Ornans meteorite, which landed in France in 1868. The light curve for this asteroid displays a period of 10.758 ± 0.004 hours with a brightness variation of 0.25 ± 0.01 in magnitude.

During 2001, 114 Kassandra was observed by radar from the Arecibo Observatory. The return signal matched an effective diameter of 100 ± 14 km. This is consistent with the asteroid dimensions computed through other means.

In popular media 
The 2009 miniseries Meteor featured 114 Kassandra being sent on a collision course with Earth due to a comet impact and the effort by scientists to stop it.

References

External links 
 
 

000114
Discoveries by Christian Peters
Named minor planets
000114
000114
18710723